Sergio Ariel Verdirame Serpentiello (born August 18, 1970 in Santa Fe, Argentina) is a former Argentine footballer who played for clubs of Argentina, Chile and Mexico.

Teams
 Colón de Santa Fe 1985-1989
 Colo-Colo 1990-1991
 Atlético Morelia 1991-1992
 Monterrey 1992-1996
 Cruz Azul 1996-1997
 Santos Laguna 1997-1998
 Veracruz 1999
 Monterrey 2000-2002

Titles
 Colo-Colo 1990 (Chilean Championship) and 1991 (Chilean Championship and Copa Libertadores)
 Cruz Azul 1997 (Torneo de Invierno)

References
 
 

1970 births
Living people
Argentine footballers
Argentine expatriate footballers
Chilean Primera División players
Liga MX players
Club Atlético Colón footballers
Colo-Colo footballers
Cruz Azul footballers
C.D. Veracruz footballers
C.F. Monterrey players
Atlético Morelia players
Santos Laguna footballers
Expatriate footballers in Chile
Expatriate footballers in Mexico
Association footballers not categorized by position
Footballers from Santa Fe, Argentina